The following lists events that happened during 1860 in Chile.

Incumbents
President of Chile: Manuel Montt

Events

Births
date unknown - Hernán Trizano (d. 1926)
6 May - Eliodoro Yáñez (d. 1932)

Deaths
23 March - Francisco Ruiz-Tagle (b. 1790)

References 

 
1860s in Chile
Chile
Chile
Years of the 19th century in Chile